The North Peace Hockey League (NPHL) is a Canadian men's Senior ice hockey league based in Northern Alberta and North Eastern British Columbia.

History
With a history that dates back to the early 1950s, the NPHL has the distinction of being the longest continually running senior hockey league currently in existence in western Canada. The league was down to two teams (Peace River Stampeders and High Prairie Regals) in the early 1970s, when it played an interlocking schedule with the South Peace Hockey League.

Prior to the start of the 2009-10 season, the league voted to disallow any team playing AAA hockey from competing in the NPHL playoffs. This change affects teams competing for the Allan Cup.  Despite this decision, the Fort St. John Flyers hosted, competed at, and won the 2010 Allan Cup.

Despite its long-standing tradition, the NPHL and its teams have struggled to stay on the ice. The 2013-14 season saw the league lose two teams when the Hythe Mustangs folded near the end of the season and the Lakeland Eagles were removed from league play.

The 2014-15 saw the league lose two more teams when the Dawson Creek Sr. Canucks and High Prairie Regals opted out of the upcoming season. The result was a six team league.

For the first time in league history the 2015-2016 season saw the Grande Prairie Athletics take a leave of absence  due to a lack of players.  Both the Dawson Creek Canucks and High Prairie Regals returned, making the league feature an East and West division once more.

The 2020-2021 and 2021-2022 seasons were cancelled due to the Covid-19 Pandemic. The NPHL returned for the 2022-2023 season, that saw the return of the Spirit River Ranger and the Valleyview Jets

Teams

North Peace Hockey League

Notes

 An asterisk (*) denotes a franchise move. See the respective team articles for more information.

Defunct
Beaverlodge 77s
Fairview Elks
Fairview Monarchs
Fairview Kings
Fort Nelson Fury
High Prairie Regals
Horse Lake Thunder
Horse Lake Chiefs
Hythe Mustangs
Lakeland Eagles (from McLennan)
McLennan Red Wings
Rycroft Flames
Peace River Stampeders
Tumbler Ridge Panthers
 Tumbler Ridge Coal Kings

Past Champions
2018-19 Grande Prairie Athletics
2017-18 Fort St. John Flyers
2016-17 Spirit River Rangers
2015-16 Spirit River Rangers
2014-15 Spirit River Rangers
2013-14 Spirit River Rangers
2012-13 Spirit River Rangers
2011-12 Falher Pirates
2010-11 Spirit River Rangers
2009-10 Grande Prairie Athletics
2008-09 Fort St. John Flyers
2007-08 Spirit River Rangers
2006-07 Peace River Stampeders
2005-06 Spirit River Rangers
2004-05 Horse Lake Thunder
2003-04 Horse Lake Thunder

Notable players
Former NHL superstar Theoren Fleury played a season with the Horse Lake Thunder in 2004.  The 2004 Horse Lake roster also included former NHL tough guy Gino Odjick, bubble players Sasha Lakovic and Dody Wood.  The Thunder had spent millions of dollars on a new arena, players and the team went on to win the championship that year, but in the 2005 Allan Cup the Thunder were defeated in the semi finals by the Thunder Bay Bombers who went on to win the Allan Cup. 
Former New York Rangers goalie and current Columbus Blue Jackets president John Davidson played one season with the High Prairie Regals in the early 1970s.
Reg Bentley, one of the famous Bentleys of NHL fame was a player/coach for the High Prairie Regals for a couple years in the early 1960s. 
Roger Bellerive, who later spent a few years with the Portland Buckaroos of the minor Western Professional Hockey League played for the Falher Pirates in the late 1950s. 
Former American Hockey League star, Fred Hilts played a few seasons for the Spirit River Rangers, who were then in the old South Peace Hockey League in the early 1960s.
Norm Skrudland, father of former NHL star Brian Skrudland, starred with the Grimshaw Huskies in the early 1960s.  
Former San Jose Sharks property Todd Holt also spent time in the NPHL.  
AHL and KHL Alumni Jon Mirasty played for the Athletics during the 2018-2019 Championship Season.
Former NHL and AHL player Wade Campbell played in Grimshaw before and after his professional career.
Other NHL Players to don an NPHL jersey include: Ed Beers and Howard Walker.

References

Ice hockey leagues in British Columbia
Ice hockey leagues in Alberta
Senior ice hockey